"Qualia" is the 16th single by Uverworld and was released September 15, 2010. This song was used as an ending theme for the film Mobile Suit Gundam 00 the Movie: A Wakening of the Trailblazer. The B-side song "Ultimate" is the theme song for the PSP game Last Ranker which was released July 15, 2010. Its Oricon top #200 weekly peak is #2, selling a total of 65,525 copies in its first week.

Track listing

CD 
 
 
 "Ultimate"

DVD 
 Uverworld core abilities Trailer
 Uverworld New classics [Sparta] (Scenes from Last Tour 2010 at Zepp Tokyo)

Personnel 
 TAKUYA∞ - vocals, rap, programming
 Katsuya - guitar, programming
 Akira - guitar, programming
 Nobuto - bass guitar
 Shintarou - drums

Uverworld songs
2010 singles
Japanese film songs
Songs written for animated films
2010 songs
Gr8! Records singles
Song articles with missing songwriters